The Fifth Wheel is a 2013 Italian comedy-drama film directed by Giovanni Veronesi. It was the opening film at the 2013 Rome Film Festival.

Cast 

 Elio Germano: Ernesto
 Alessandra Mastronardi: Angela
 Ricky Memphis: Giacinto
 Sergio Rubini: Fabrizio Del Monte
 Virginia Raffaele: Mara
 Alessandro Haber: il Maestro
 Ubaldo Pantani: Toscano
 Francesca Antonelli: Agnese
 Maurizio Battista: zio Alberto
 Francesca D'Aloja: Donna Giulia
 Massimo Wertmüller: padre di Ernesto
 Elena Di Cioccio: Giuliana
 Luis Molteni: Cocco
 Dalila Di Lazzaro: signora veneta

References

External links

2013 films
Italian comedy-drama films
2013 comedy-drama films
Films directed by Giovanni Veronesi
2010s Italian-language films
2010s Italian films